The 1923 Central American Treaty of Peace and Amity, officially known as the General Treaty of Peace and Amity, 1923, was a treaty signed by the five nations of Central America in 1923 which established that all nations would denounce and not recognize any government which arose in any of the five signatory nations through illegal means (ie: coup d'état, revolution). The treaty remained effective from its signing on 7 February 1923 until it was denounced by the Central American Court of Justice in 1934.

History 

A similar treaty was signed and ratified in the 1907 Central American Treaty of Peace and Amity but the treaty fell apart in 1917 when Nicaragua denounced the treaty.

The five nations of Costa Rica, El Salvador, Guatemala, Honduras, and Nicaragua agreed to draft a new treaty with a similar function and were invited by United States President Warren G. Harding on 4 December 1922 to draft and sign the treaty in Washington D.C. The treaty outlined that no signatory nation would recognize any government which arose in any other signatory nation which rose to power via a revolution or a coup d'état. The treaty also outlawed the signing of any secret treaties between nations, outlawed radical changing of Constitutions, banned nations from intervening in civil wars, and reaffirming the legitimacy of the Central American Court of Justice. The treaty also placed limitations of military and naval armaments.

The United States did not sign the treaty, but did follow its terms as displayed when the it refused to recognize the change of government in El Salvador when General Maximiliano Hernández Martínez overthrew the democratically elected President, Arturo Araujo, on 2 December 1931. The United States' initial refusal to recognize Hernández Martínez's government, however, led to the eventual collapse of the treaty since in 1932, both Costa Rica and El Salvador denounced the treaty on 23 December and 26 December, respectively. Although El Salvador never ratified the treaty, Costa Rica did, leaving the treaty with only Guatemala and Nicaragua as its only legal adherents, since Honduras never ratified it either.

In 1934, the Central American Court of Justice denounced the treaty, effectively ending its legality in all five nations.

Contents of the Treaty

Article I

Article II

Signatories 

The following five nations signed the treaty.

Despite signing the treaty, neither El Salvador nor Honduras actually ratified the treaty.

Timeline of Membership 

 7 February 1923 – The treaty was signed by Costa Rica, El Salvador, Guatemala, Honduras, and Nicaragua. Only Costa Rica, Guatemala, and Nicaragua ratified the treaty.
 2 December 1931 – The Salvadoran government was overthrown by the military, establishing a government which was illegal according to the treaty. 
 23 December 1932 – President Ricardo Jiménez Oreamuno of Costa Rica denounced the treaty. 
 26 December 1932 – President Maximiliano Hernández Martínez of El Salvador denounced the treaty. 
 1934 – The Central American Court of Justice denounced the treaty.

See also 

1907 Central American Treaty of Peace and Amity

Notes

References 

History of Central America
1923 in Central America
1923 in Costa Rica
1923 in El Salvador
1923 in Guatemala
1923 in Honduras
1923 in Nicaragua
Treaties of Nicaragua
Treaties of El Salvador
Treaties of Guatemala
Treaties of Honduras
Treaties of Costa Rica
Treaties entered into force in 1923
Treaties concluded in 1932
Treaties concluded in 1934